Ping Yeung is a village in Ta Kwu Ling, North District, Hong Kong.

Administration
Ping Yeung is a recognized village under the New Territories Small House Policy. It is one of the villages represented within the Ta Kwu Ling District Rural Committee. For electoral purposes, Ping Yeung is part of the Sha Ta constituency, which is currently represented by Ko Wai-kei.

History
Members of the Hakka Chan clan moved from today's Shenzhen in mainland China and settled in Ping Yeung during the late 19th century. Other members of the clan settled in Yim Tin Tsai in Tai Po and Yim Tin Tsai in Sai Kung.

References

External links

 Delineation of area of existing village Ping Yeung (Ta Kwu Ling) for election of resident representative (2019 to 2022)
 

Villages in North District, Hong Kong